The 1978–79 NBA season was the Nuggets' 3rd season in the NBA and 12th season as a franchise.

In the playoffs, the Nuggets lost to the Los Angeles Lakers in three games in the First Round.

The Nuggets would not make the playoffs again until 1982.

Draft picks

Roster

Regular season

Season standings

z - clinched division title
y - clinched division title
x - clinched playoff spot

Record vs. opponents

Playoffs

|- align="center" bgcolor="#ccffcc"
| 1
| April 10
| Los Angeles
| W 119–105
| Dan Issel (30)
| Dan Issel (10)
| Bob Wilkerson (7)
| McNichols Sports Arena16,011
| 1–0
|- align="center" bgcolor="#ffcccc"
| 2
| April 13
| @ Los Angeles
| L 109–121
| David Thompson (29)
| Tom Boswell (12)
| Tom Boswell (7)
| The Forum14,182
| 1–1
|- align="center" bgcolor="#ffcccc"
| 3
| April 16
| Los Angeles
| L 111–112
| David Thompson (28)
| Dan Issel (10)
| David Thompson (7)
| McNichols Sports Arena16,181
| 1–2
|-

References

Denver Nuggets seasons
Denver
Denver Nuggets
Denver Nuggets